Saint Magdalene Church, Ruhnu, also known as Ruhnu Wooden Church is a wooden church in Ruhnu Island, Estonia. It is the oldest preserved wooden shrine in Estonia. Architecturally, it is unique in Europe.

The church was built in 1643–1644.

Next to the wooden church is located Ruhnu New Church.

References

External links

Churches in Estonia
Ruhnu
Wooden buildings and structures in Estonia